Karmyoddha is a 1992 Bollywood action film. It stars Raj Babbar, Dimple Kapadia in lead roles.

Music
Nadira Babbar wrote all the songs. 

Haye Ye Ladhkiya - Amit Kumar
Jhumpak Jhumpak Tara Ra Ram - Suresh Wadkar, Alka Yagnik
Uff Ye Kya Hua - Asha Bhosle, Mohammed Aziz
Ang Ang Mere Jadu Jage - Amit Kumar, Anuradha Paudwal
"Zara Sa Mujhe Chhua Toh" - Lata Mangeshkar, Amit Kumar

References

External links

1992 films
1990s Hindi-language films
Films scored by Ajit Varman